This is a timeline of the Song dynasty (960–1279). The Song dynasty was founded by Zhao Kuangyin, posthumously known as Emperor Taizu of Song, who ended the period of division known as the Five Dynasties and Ten Kingdoms period. The Song dynasty is commonly separated into two historical periods, the Northern Song (960–1127) and the Southern Song (1127–1279), divided by the loss of the north to the Jurchen Jin dynasty (1115–1234). In 1279, the Mongol Yuan dynasty conquered the Song.

10th century

960s

970s

980s

990s

11th century

1000s

1010s

1020s

1030s

1040s

1050s

1060s

1070s

1080s

1090s

12th century

1100s

1110s

1120s

1130s

1140s

1150s

1160s

1170s

1180s

1190s

13th century

1200s

1210s

1220s

1230s

1240s

1250s

1260s

1270s

Gallery

See also
Timeline of the Khitans
Timeline of the Jurchens
Timeline of the Tanguts

References

Bibliography

 .

 (alk. paper)

 

  (paperback).
 

 
 .

 .

 
 
 

 
 
 
 
 
 
 
 
 
 
 .

External links

Song Dynasty in China
China 7 BC To 1279

Song dynasty
Song